In investment banking, a bookrunner is usually the main underwriter or lead-manager/arranger/coordinator in equity, debt, or hybrid securities issuances. The bookrunner usually syndicates with other investment banks in order to lower its risk. The bookrunner is listed first among all underwriters participating in the issuance. When more than one bookrunner manages a security issuance, the parties are referred to as "joint bookrunners", or a "multi-bookrunner syndicate".

The bank that runs the books is the closest one to the issuer and controls the allocations of shares to investors, holding significant discretion in doing so, which places the bookrunner in a very favored position.

References

External links
New Look mandate continues Credit Suisse run
Qatari Diar appoints Qatar Islamic Bank as Initial Mandated Lead Arranger and Bookrunner for QAR 3.5 Billion Syndicated Islamic Facility
Bank of America Grabs Top Bookrunner Slot

Corporate finance
Initial public offering